Doboluk Rural District is in Arjomand District of Firuzkuh County, Tehran province, Iran. At the National Census of 2006, its population was 3,761 in 1,111 households. There were 3,676 inhabitants in 1,244 households at the following census of 2011. At the most recent census of 2016, the population of the rural district was 3,475 in 1,210 households. The largest of its 12 villages was Asur, with 551 people.

References 

Firuzkuh County

Rural Districts of Tehran Province

Populated places in Tehran Province

Populated places in Firuzkuh County